Cindy Chandler may refer to:
Cindy Chandler (Lost), fictional character of Lost
Cindy Chandler née Parker, fictional character of All My Children

See also
Cynthia Chandler Preston Cortlandt, fictional character of All My Children portrayed by Jane Elliot
Chandler (surname)